Past the Point of Rescue is the second studio album by American country music artist Hal Ketchum. His first major-label album, it was released in 1991 on Curb Records and has been certified gold by the RIAA. The album produced four singles for him on the Billboard Hot Country Singles & Tracks (now Hot Country Songs) charts between 1991 and 1992. In chronological order, these were "Small Town Saturday Night", "I Know Where Love Lives", "Past the Point of Rescue", and a cover of The Vogues' "Five O'Clock World"; respectively, these songs reached #2, #13, #2, and #16 on the country charts. "Past the Point of Rescue" has been recorded by several other artists, most notably the Dixie Chicks on their 1992 album Little Ol' Cowgirl.

Track listing

Personnel
Richard Bennett – acoustic guitar
Bruce Bouton – steel guitar
Gary Burr – background vocals
Dave Francis – background vocals
Hal Ketchum – lead vocals, background vocals, acoustic guitar
Chris Leuzinger – acoustic guitar, electric guitar
Kathy Mattea – background vocals
Allen Reynolds – background vocals
Milton Sledge – drums
Will Smith – autoharp
Pete Wasner – keyboards
Bob Wray – bass guitar

Chart performance

References

1991 albums
Albums produced by Allen Reynolds
Curb Records albums
Hal Ketchum albums